Frank v. Maryland, 359 U.S. 360 (1959), was a United States Supreme Court case interpreting the Fourth Amendment to the United States Constitution.

Frank refused to allow the health inspectors into his home citing the Fourth Amendment. Inspectors were trying to perform an administrative search for code violations, specifically a rat infestation, not a criminal investigation, so they did not believe they were violating the Fourth Amendment. The Court, in an opinion written by Felix Frankfurter, decided in favor of the inspectors claiming that the search would benefit the public more than Frank's interests in privacy.

The Supreme Court would reverse this decision eight years later in Camara v. Municipal Court of City and County of San Francisco, ruling that the City of San Francisco could not prosecute a person for refusing to consent to a search of their home by a city inspector, and the inspector may only search either by having consent, or must have a search warrant issued based on probable cause of a violation of law.

See also
List of United States Supreme Court cases, volume 360
Wolf v. Colorado,

References

External links

United States Fourth Amendment case law
United States Supreme Court cases
United States Supreme Court cases of the Warren Court
1959 in United States case law